Daniel Dicker (born 5 June 1995) is an Austrian handball player for HSG Graz and the Austrian national team.

He represented Austria at the 2019 World Men's Handball Championship.

References

External links

1995 births
Living people
Austrian male handball players
Sportspeople from Graz